The Phantom City is a 1928 American silent Western film directed by Albert S. Rogell and written by Adele Buffington and Fred Allen. The film stars Ken Maynard, Eugenia Gilbert, James Mason, Charles Hill Mailes, Jack McDonald and Blue Washington. The film was released on December 23, 1928, by First National Pictures.

Plot
In a story set in the Wild West, an anonymous killer plots to steal a gold mine from its rightful owner. Tim Kelly (Maynard) and Joe Bridges (Mason) are summoned to Gold City, a long abandoned mining town, by a mysterious masked phantom. Tim learns he is to inherit a gold mine there which is still active, but he receives a dire warning from the killer telling him to leave town. It turns out the phantom who summoned them there was Tim's father, and Tim discovers the killer's identity is Joe Bridges, who was trying to get the mine for himself. As Bridges attempts to leave town with the gold, he accidentally rides off a cliff to his death.

Cast   
 Ken Maynard as Tim Kelly
 Eugenia Gilbert as Sally Ann Drew
 James Mason as Joe Bridges
 Charles Hill Mailes as Benedict 
 Jack McDonald as Simon
 Blue Washington as 'Blue'
 Ben Corbett as Gang Member
 Tarzan as Tarzan the horse

Production
Ken Maynard had earlier mixed the horror and western genres with his 1926 film The Haunted Ranch, and its success led to The Phantom City. Phantom City was regarded as one of Ken Maynard's best silent films, but in 1932 when the film was remade with sound as Haunted Gold (starring John Wayne), the silent version dropped out of circulation. Both versions featured African American actor Blue Washington doing his racially offensive "scared Negro" routine. The John Wayne remake utilized a lot of stock footage from the Ken Maynard version. Director Rogell later moved into directing television westerns such as Broken Arrow in the 1950s.

References

External links
 

1928 films
1928 Western (genre) films
American black-and-white films
1920s English-language films
Films directed by Albert S. Rogell
Films set in ghost towns
First National Pictures films
Silent American Western (genre) films
1920s American films